Santiago "Nano" Krieger (born 13 April 1995) is an Argentine professional footballer who plays for Portugal club RMSC as a striker.

External links
 Santiago Krieger at playmakerstats.com (English version of ogol.com.br)

Living people
1995 births
Argentine footballers
Association football forwards
Clube do Remo players
People from Coronel Suárez Partido
Sportspeople from Buenos Aires Province
Argentine people of Volga German descent